Liam Kerrigan (born 9 May 2000) is an Irish footballer who plays as a midfielder, winger, or striker for Como.

Career
Kerrigan started his career with Irish side Sligo Rovers. After 3 years with UCD, he signed for Como in the Italian second tier in July 2022. On 21 August 2022, Kerrigan made his league debut for the club and also scored his first goal for the club in a 2–2 draw away to Pisa. Kerrigan suffered a long term injury in September 2022, tearing his Anterior cruciate ligament.

Career statistics

References

External links

 

2000 births
Association football forwards
Association football midfielders
Association football wingers
Como 1907 players
Expatriate footballers in Italy
Irish expatriate sportspeople in Italy 
League of Ireland players 
Serie B players
Living people
Republic of Ireland expatriate association footballers
Republic of Ireland association footballers
Republic of Ireland youth international footballers
Sligo Rovers F.C. players
University College Dublin A.F.C. players
People from Sligo (town)